The Heights is an Australian television drama series which premiered on ABC on 22 February 2019. In August 2019, the series was renewed for a second season of 30 episodes.

Plot
The series is set in the inner‐city neighbourhood of Arcadia Heights. It explores the relationships between the residents of the Arcadia social housing tower and the people who live in the rapidly gentrifying community that surrounds it.

Cast

Main
 Marcus Graham (series 1) and Rupert Reid (series 2) as Krez “Pav” Pavlovic, retired cop
 Shari Sebbens as Leonie Farrell, Pav's estranged wife and corporate lawyer
 Calen Tassone as Mich Pavlovic-Farrell, Pav and Leonie's son
 Roz Hammond as Claudia Rosso, an emergency doctor new to the area
 Bridie McKim as Sabine Rosso, Claudia's teenage daughter with mild cerebral palsy
 Fiona Press as Hazel Murphy, landlady who runs the local pub
 Mitchell Bourke as Ryan Murphy, Hazel's estranged son
 Dan Paris as Mark Davies, local tradie
 Saskia Hampele as Renee Davies, Mark's wife
 Phoenix Raei as Ash Jafari, Iranian refugee struggling with his sexuality
 Yazeed Daher as Kam Jafari, Ash's brother
 Carina Hoang as Iris Tran, Vietnamese grocery store owner
 Koa Nuen as Sully Tran, Iris' gay son
 Cara McCarthy as Ana Novak, nurse
 Briallen Clarke as Shannon Murphy, Hazel's daughter (series 2, recurring series 1)
 Kelton Pell as Uncle Max, Hazel's lover (series 2, recurring series 1)

Recurring
 Bernie Davis as Bruce Farrell, Leonie's father (series 1)
 Davilia O'Connor as Audrey (series 1)
 Geoffrey Miethe as Ernie, community lawyer
 Noel O'Neill as Watto
 Siria Kickett as Kat Pavlovic-Farrell, Pav and Leonie's daughter
 Asher Yasbincek as Rose
 Melody Rom as Amira
 Nicholas Di Nardo as Dane Worsfield
 Amelia Kelly as Frankie Davies, Mark and Renee's daughter
 Amir Rahimzadeh as Hamid Jafari, Ash's uncle
 Jasmine Sadati as Fatema Jafari, Ash's cousin
 Orlando Borg as Noah Davies, Mark and Renee's daughter
 Rasta Karami as Laila Jafari, Ash's cousin
 Ze Winters as Maryam Jafari, Ash's aunt
 Craig Fong as Benny
 Liam Graham as Tyler (series 1)
 Alex Williams as Dr. Evan Clarke
 Zachary Drieberg as James Fraser (series 1)
 Caris Eves as Amber Bathgate, school teacher
 Angela Mahlatjie as Lottie
 Lynette Narkle as Aunty Pam
 Mary Soudi as Helena (series 2)
 Claire Gazzo as Erika (series 2)

Episodes

Season 1 (2019)

Season 2 (2020)

Production
The Heights is produced in Perth, Australia by Matchbox Pictures and For Pete's Sake Productions. It was created by Warren Clarke and Que Minh Luu. The first season was written by Hannah Carroll Chapman, Romina Accurso, Peter Mattessi, Megan Palinkas, Nick King, Clare Atkins, Niki Aken, Dot West, Magda Wozniak, Mithila Gupta, Tracey Defty‐Rashid, Larissa Behrendt, Miley Tunnecliffe, Katie Beckett and Melissa Lee Speyer. The first season was directed by James Bogle, Andrew Prowse, Renee Webster and Darlene Johnson and produced by Peta Astbury-Bulsara and Warren Clarke.

International broadcast
In the United Kingdom, the first season of The Heights began broadcasting on BBC One in June 2020, during the Doctors summer break. The second season was shown directly after the conclusion of the first, with several episodes airing before their premiere on ABC. In Ireland, RTÉ One began broadcasting double episodes of season one on 10 August 2020, as a summer replacement for Today with Maura and Daithi.

Awards and nominations

Notes
 for "Most Outstanding Performance by an Ensemble in a Drama Series": Marcus Graham, Shari Sebbens, Calen Tassone, Roz Hammond, Bridie McKim, Fiona Press, Mitchell Bourke, Dan Paris, Saskia Hampele, Phoenix Raei, Yazeed Daher, Carina Hoang, Koa Nuen, Cara McCarthy and Briallen Clarke

References

External links
 
 

Australian television soap operas
2010s Australian drama television series
2020s Australian drama television series
2019 Australian television series debuts
Australian Broadcasting Corporation original programming
English-language television shows
Television series by Matchbox Pictures